Aleksandra Goncharova was a Russian film actress.

Selected filmography 
 1908 — 16th Century Russian Wedding
 1909 — Boyarin Orsha
 1910 — The Water Nymph
 1910 — The Queen of Spades
 1911 — Defence of Sevastopol

References

External links 
Александра Гончарова on kino-teatr.ru

Russian film actresses
1888 births
1969 deaths